Photoprotection is the biochemical process that helps organisms cope with molecular damage caused by sunlight.  Plants and other oxygenic phototrophs have developed a suite of photoprotective mechanisms to prevent photoinhibition and oxidative stress caused by excess or fluctuating light conditions.  Humans and other animals have also developed photoprotective mechanisms to avoid UV photodamage to the skin, prevent DNA damage, and minimize the downstream effects of oxidative stress.

In photosynthetic organisms
In organisms that perform oxygenic photosynthesis, excess light may lead to photoinhibition, or photoinactivation of the reaction centers, a process that does not necessarily involve chemical damage.    When photosynthetic antenna pigments such as chlorophyll are excited by light absorption, unproductive reactions may occur by charge transfer to molecules with unpaired electrons.  Because oxygenic phototrophs generate O2 as a byproduct from the photocatalyzed splitting of water (H2O), photosynthetic organisms have a particular risk of forming reactive oxygen species.

Therefore, a diverse suite of mechanisms has developed in photosynthetic organisms to mitigate these potential threats, which become exacerbated under high irradiance, fluctuating light conditions, in adverse environmental conditions such as cold or drought, and while experiencing nutrient deficiencies which cause an imbalance between energetic sinks and sources.

In eukaryotic phototrophs, these mechanisms include non-photochemical quenching mechanisms such as the xanthophyll cycle, biochemical pathways which serve as "relief valves", structural rearrangements of the complexes in the photosynthetic apparatus, and use of antioxidant molecules.  Higher plants sometimes employ strategies such as reorientation of leaf axes to minimize incident light striking the surface.  Mechanisms may also act on a longer time-scale, such as up-regulation of stress response proteins or down-regulation of pigment biosynthesis, although these processes are better characterized as "photoacclimatization" processes.

Cyanobacteria possess some unique strategies for photoprotection which have not been identified in plants nor in algae.  For example, most cyanobacteria possess an Orange Carotenoid Protein (OCP), which serves as a novel form of non-photochemical quenching.  Another unique, albeit poorly-understood, cyanobacterial strategy involves the IsiA chlorophyll-binding protein, which can aggregate with carotenoids and form rings around the PSI reaction center complexes to aid in photoprotective energy dissipation. Some other cyanobacterial strategies may involve state-transitions of the phycobilisome antenna complex
, photoreduction of water with the Flavodiiron proteins, and futile cycling of CO2
.

In plants 
It is widely known that plants need light to survive, grow and reproduce. It is often assumed that more light is always beneficial; however, excess light can actually be harmful for some species of plants. Just as animals require a fine balance of resources, plants require a specific balance of light intensity and wavelength for optimal growth (this can vary from plant to plant). Optimizing the process of photosynthesis is essential for survival when environmental conditions are ideal and acclimation when environmental conditions are severe. When exposed to high light intensity, a plant reacts to mitigate the harmful effects of excess light.

To best protect themselves from excess light, plants employ a multitude of methods to minimize harm inflicted by excess light. A variety of photoreceptors are used by plants to detect light intensity, direction and duration. In response to excess light, some photoreceptors have the ability to shift chloroplasts within the cell farther from the light source thus decreasing the harm done by superfluous light. Similarly, plants are able to produce enzymes that are essential to photoprotection such as Anthocyanin synthase. Plants deficient in photoprotection enzymes are much more sensitive to light damage than plants with functioning photoprotection enzymes. Also, plants produce a variety of secondary metabolites beneficial for their survival and protection from excess light. These secondary metabolites that provide plants with protection are commonly used in human sunscreen and pharmaceutical drugs to supplement the inadequate light protection that is innate to human skin cells. Various pigments and compounds can be employed by plants as a form of UV photoprotection as well.

Pigmentation is one method employed by a variety of plants as a form of photoprotection. For example, in Antarctica, native mosses of green color can be found naturally shaded by rocks or other physical barriers while red colored mosses of the same species are likely to be found in wind and sun exposed locations. This variation in color is due to light intensity. Photoreceptors in mosses, phytochromes (red wavelengths) and phototropins (blue wavelengths), assist in the regulation of pigmentation. To better understand this phenomenon, Waterman et al. conducted an experiment to analyze the photoprotective qualities of UVACs (Ultraviolet Absorbing Compounds) and red pigmentation in antarctic mosses. Moss specimens of species Ceratodon purpureus, Bryum pseudotriquetrum and Schistidium antarctici were collected from an island region in East Antarctica. All specimens were then grown and observed in a lab setting under constant light and water conditions to assess photosynthesis, UVAC and pigmentation production. Moss gametophytes of red and green varieties were exposed to light and consistent watering for a period of two weeks. Following the growth observation, cell wall pigments were extracted from the moss specimens. These extracts were tested using UV–Vis spectrophotometry which uses light from the UV and visible spectrum to create an image depicting light absorbance. UVACs are typically found in the cytoplasm of the cell; however, when exposed to high-intensity light, UVACs are transported into the cell wall. It was found that mosses with higher concentrations of red pigments and UVACs located in the cell walls, rather than intracellularly, performed better in higher intensity light. Color change in the mosses was found not to be due to chloroplast movement within the cell. It was found that UVACs and red pigments function as long-term photoprotection in Antarctic mosses. Therefore, in response to high-intensity light stress, the production of UVACs and red pigmentation is up-regulated.

Knowing that plants are able to differentially respond to varying concentrations and intensities of light, it is essential to understand why these reactions are important. Due to a steady rise in global temperatures in recent years, many plants have become more susceptible to light damage. Many factors including soil nutrient richness, ambient temperature fluctuation and water availability all impact the photoprotection process in plants. Plants exposed to high light intensity coupled with water deficits displayed a significantly inhibited photoprotection response. Although not yet fully understood, photoprotection is an essential function of plants.

In humans
Photoprotection of the human skin is achieved by extremely efficient internal conversion of DNA, proteins and melanin. Internal conversion is a photochemical process that converts the energy of the UV photon into small, harmless amounts of heat. If the energy of the UV photon were not transformed into heat, then it would lead to the generation of free radicals or other harmful reactive chemical species (e.g. singlet oxygen, or hydroxyl radical).

In DNA this photoprotective mechanism evolved four billion years ago at the dawn of life. The purpose of this extremely efficient photoprotective mechanism is to prevent direct DNA damage and indirect DNA damage. The ultrafast internal conversion of DNA reduces the excited state lifetime of DNA to only a few femtoseconds (10−15s)—this way the excited DNA does not have enough time to react with other molecules.

For melanin this mechanism has developed later in the course of evolution. Melanin is such an efficient photoprotective substance that it dissipates more than 99.9% of the absorbed UV radiation as heat.
 This means that less than 0.1% of the excited melanin molecules will undergo harmful chemical reactions or produce free radicals.

Artificial melanin
The cosmetic industry claims that the UV filter acts as an "artificial melanin". But those artificial substances used in sunscreens do not efficiently dissipate the energy of the UV photon as heat. Instead these substances have a very long excited state lifetime. In fact, the substances used in sunscreens are often used as photosensitizers in chemical reactions. (see Benzophenone).

Oxybenzone, titanium oxide and octyl methoxycinnamate are photoprotective agents used in many sunscreens, providing broad-spectrum UV coverage, including UVB and short-wave UVA rays.

See also 
Sunscreen
Photocarcinogen
Direct DNA damage
Indirect DNA damage

References 

Biological defense mechanisms
Photochemistry
Skin physiology
Sun tanning